Yantuganovo (Yantuğan) is a rural locality (a village) in Syultinsky Selsoviet, Ilishevsky District, Bashkortostan, Russia. The population was 202 as of 2010. There are 2 streets.

Geography 
Yantuganovo is located 20 km south of Verkhneyarkeyevo (the district's administrative centre) by road. Syultino is the nearest rural locality.

References 

Rural localities in Ilishevsky District